= Ashlar Ridge =

Ridge in Alberta, Canada

Coordinates: 53.1727777°N 117.805°W

Ashlar Ridge is a ridge in Alberta, Canada.

The ridge has the character of an ashlar wall, hence the name.
